The Filharmonia Śląska w Katowicach is a music institution in Katowice, Silesia, Poland. The Silesian Philharmonic in Katowice was founded in 1945. The first concert of the orchestra took place on 26 of May 1945.  A mixed choir was added in 1973.

The Silesian Philharmonic has a well-established position in the cultural life of the Upper Silesian Metropolitan Union. Over the decades, the most renowned musicians performed with it, for example Witold Małcużyński, Igor Oistrakh, Sviatoslav Richter, Adam Taubitz..

Directors
 Jan Niwinski (1945-1947)
 Witold Krzemienski (1947-1949)
 Stanisław Skrowaczewski (1949-1953)
 Karol Stryja (1953-1990)
 Jerzy Swoboda (1990-1998)
 Music Director Mirosław Jacek Błaszczyk (1998- ) General Director Grażyna Szymborska (2001-)

External links
(English) (Polish)

Buildings and structures in Katowice
Musical groups established in 1945
Polish orchestras
Polish culture
Concert halls in Poland
Tourist attractions in Silesian Voivodeship
1945 establishments in Poland
Culture in Katowice
Polish choirs
Organisations based in Katowice